Peter Butler Olney (July 23, 1843 Oxford, Worcester County, Massachusetts - February 9, 1922 Cedarhurst, Nassau County, New York) was an American lawyer and politician from New York.

Life
He attended Phillips Andover Academy and graduated from Harvard College in 1864, and from Harvard Law School in 1866. He was admitted to the bar and commenced practice in the firm of Evarts, Southmayd & Choate in New York City. In 1869, he formed a partnership with Ex-Secretary of State of New York Francis C. Barlow. In 1872, Barlow took office as State Attorney General and Olney helped with the prosecution of the members of the Tweed Ring.

He married Mary Sigourney Butler, and they had four sons: Peter B. Olney, Jr. (1881-1968), Richard Olney, Wilson Olney and Sigourney B. Olney.

In 1875, Olney ran on the Tammany ticket for New York County District Attorney but was defeated by the incumbent Republican Benjamin K. Phelps. Afterwards Olney left Tammany and joined the "County Democracy", the Anti-Tammany Democrats of New York City. After the death of D.A. John McKeon and the resignation of Wheeler H. Peckham after only a week in office, Governor Grover Cleveland appointed Olney in December 1883 as D.A. to fill the vacancy until the end of 1884.

From 1897 until his death, he practiced law as senior partner of the firm of Olney & Comstock. From 1898 on he was also a U.S. Referee in Bankruptcy. In 1919, he was appointed by Surrogate Fowler as referee to investigate claims against the estate of the deceased actress Anna Held.

Olney died from pneumonia at his home at Cedarhurst, Long Island. He was a trustee of Teachers College. U.S. Attorney General and Secretary of State Richard Olney was his brother.

Sources
LOCAL POLITICAL NOTES in NYT on October 23, 1875
WHEELER H. PECKHAM RESIGNS.; ILL HEALTH CAUSES HIM TO GIVE PLACE TO PETER B. OLNEY AS DISTRICT ATTORNEY in NYT on December 10, 1883
THE NEW DISTRICT ATTORNEY in NYT on December 12, 1883
PETER BUTLER OLNEY DIES OF PNEUMONIA in NYT on February 10, 1922

1843 births
1922 deaths
New York County District Attorneys
People from Oxford, Massachusetts
People from Cedarhurst, New York
Harvard Law School alumni
Phillips Academy alumni
Deaths from pneumonia in New York (state)
Harvard College alumni